The Telephone Historical Centre was a telecommunications museum located in Edmonton, Alberta dedicated to preserving the history of the telephone in Edmonton. Founded by a group of retired ED TEL employees, the Telephone Historical Centre was opened on December 3, 1987, in a former telephone exchange building in Old Strathcona. In 2004, it moved to its final location in the Prince of Wales Armouries Heritage Centre in Central Edmonton. The Telephone Historical Centre provided both group and individual tours and, as a hands-on museum, allows for visitors to interact with the artifacts. In April 2019, the Edmonton Telephone Historical Centre Foundation voted to dissolve, citing relevancy, financial issues, structural problems and succession planning as the reasons for closing.

Collections
The Telephone Historical Centre had a large collection of original telephones from as early as 1878, two years after the telephone was invented. The museum also contained replicas of several early telephones including Alexander Graham Bell’s Gallows Frame Telephone, Thomas A. Watson’s Thumper Phone, and the first phone imported into Edmonton by Dominion Telegraph Agent Alexander Taylor.

Exhibits included a manual telephone switchboard, a Step-by-Step private automatic branch exchange (demonstrating the stepping switch principle), and a phone booth from the 1930s. A mobile-telephone exhibit traced the changes in mobile phone technology from 1980s car phones to current cellular phones. Other exhibits allow visitors to learn about electricity, sound, and magnetism.

Archives
The Telephone Historical Centre Archives housed a collection of Edmonton telephone directories from 1895 to the present. Additionally, the archives included technical manuals related to telecommunications dating as far back as the 1800s, and a variety of books on the telephone and its history. The Telephone Historical Centre Archives also contained photographs chronicling the telephone’s use in Edmonton.

References

External links
 

Museums in Edmonton
History of Edmonton
History of the telephone
Telecommunications museums
Telephone museums